Castanopsis pedunculata is a tree in the family Fagaceae. The specific epithet  is from the Latin meaning "having a peduncle".

Description
The brown bark is flaky to lenticellate.

Distribution and habitat
Castanopsis pedunculata is endemic to Borneo. Its habitat is lowland dipterocarp forests up to  altitude.

References

pedunculata
Endemic flora of Borneo
Trees of Borneo
Plants described in 1968
Flora of the Borneo lowland rain forests